Phillip John Weightman (born 10 February 1958) is an Australian politician. He was a Labor member of the Legislative Assembly of Queensland from 2006 to 2009, representing the district of Cleveland.

References

1958 births
Living people
Members of the Queensland Legislative Assembly
Australian Labor Party members of the Parliament of Queensland
21st-century Australian politicians